Rose Roberts was a translator, poet, and writer of sermons.

Life

She had at least one sister as well as two brothers: one, Richard, was a headmaster and the other, William, was a poet. Roberts' family had roots in Abergavenny, but she herself seems to have lived in Bristol, Gloucester, then London.

Little is known of her life. She may have known Hannah More; her nieces were her friends.

Her first publication was a translation of Marmontel's Tales. Then she produced a collection of sermons, described as "pithy and conservative", which were popular enough to go into a second, American edition. She wrote at least one drama, though it was not performed She has been credited with "many translated and perhaps original" tales in the Lady's Magazine, 1771–1782

Her Sermons singled out by Mary Scott for praise in The Female Advocate (1775), though Scott could not name her since the text was published anonymously:
And Thou, whose pen, congenial to thy breast,
Hath shown us virtue by the Graces drest. (ll. 407–408)

Works
Translator. Select Moral Tales. Written by Jean François Marmontel.  Gloucester, 1763.
Sermons written by a lady. 1770
Translator. Elements of the history of France. Written by Abbé Millot. 1771 (abridged translation)
Translator. The triumph of truth; or, Memoirs of Mr. De La Villette. Translated from the French By R. Roberts. In two volumes. Written by Jeanne-Marie Leprince de Beaumont. London: Thomas Cadell, 1775.
Translator. The Peruvian Letters, translated from the French with an additional original volume. Written by Françoise de Graffigny. London: Thomas Cadell, 1774. 
Malcolm, 1779 (tragedy, unproduced)
Albert, Edward and Laura, and the Hermit of Priestland; Three Legendary Tales. London: Cadell, 1783. (Internet Archive)

Notes

References
 Blain, Virginia, et al., eds. The Feminist Companion to Literature in English. New Haven and London: Yale UP, 1990.
 "Roberts, Rose." The Women's Print History Project, 2019, Person ID 2537. Accessed 2022-07-04. (WPHP)
 Todd, Janet, ed. British Women Writers: a critical reference guide. London: Routledge, 1989.

18th-century births
18th-century English writers
18th-century English women writers
18th-century British women writers
English novelists
British women novelists